Antonina Viktorovna Makhina-Dumcheva-Zelikovich (born 4 March 1958 in Ryazan) is a Russian rower. She competed for the Soviet Union in the 1980 and 1988 Summer Olympics and for the Unified Team at the 1992 Summer Olympics.

References

External links
 
 
 
 
 

1958 births
Living people
Russian female rowers
Olympic rowers of the Soviet Union
Olympic rowers of the Unified Team
Olympic silver medalists for the Soviet Union
Olympic bronze medalists for the Unified Team
Rowers at the 1980 Summer Olympics
Rowers at the 1988 Summer Olympics
Rowers at the 1992 Summer Olympics
Olympic medalists in rowing
Medalists at the 1992 Summer Olympics
Medalists at the 1988 Summer Olympics
Medalists at the 1980 Summer Olympics
World Rowing Championships medalists for the Soviet Union